Tuckerville is an American reality television series that aired on TLC in 2005. It is about the life of American country music artist Tanya Tucker and her three children; Presley, Grayson, and Layla. The show took place in Tucker's mansion outside Nashville, Tennessee. The program aired on Saturday's at 10:00 PM and 9:00 PM central time. Following the show's cancellation, Tucker told Billboard magazine that six new shows were filmed and they were shopping for networks. However, no follow-up program was picked up.

References

2000s American reality television series
2005 American television series debuts
2006 American television series endings
TLC (TV network) original programming